Essex Technical High School is a career technical high school located in Hathorne, Massachusetts, United States which is a sub-section of Danvers, Massachusetts. was opened in the Fall of 2016 after the merger of North Shore Technical High School and  Essex Agricultural & Technical High School, along with several programs from Peabody Vocational School.

Career Technical Education Academy Model 
Essex Technical High School is composed of four Academies. Each academy has its own associate principal, guidance counselors, and other support staff. Career Technical Education Programs are divided into the following academies:  
 Animal & Plant Science Academy (A): Companion Animals, Equine Science, Natural Resource Management, Sustainable Horticulture, Veterinary Technology
 Technology & Services Academy (B): Advanced Manufacturing, Automotive Collision Repair & Refinishing, Automotive Technology, Culinary Arts, Design & Visual Communications, Graphic Communications, Information Technology Services 
 Life & Natural Science Academy (D): Biotechnology, Cosmetology, Dental Assisting, Environmental Technology, Health Assisting 
 Construction Technology Academy (E): Arboriculture, Carpentry, Electricity, Heating, Ventilation, Air Conditioning & Refrigeration, Landscaping & Turf Management, Masonry & Tile Setting, Plumbing

References

External links
 

Public high schools in Massachusetts
2016 establishments in Massachusetts
Schools in Essex County, Massachusetts